Radzim  is a village in the administrative district of Gmina Kamień Krajeński, within Sępólno County, Kuyavian-Pomeranian Voivodeship, in north-central Poland.

The village has a population of 310.

During the occupation of Poland (World War II), the Germans operated a temporary concentration camp in the village (Internierungslager Resmin). Its prisoners were Poles and Jews from nearby towns of Sępólno Krajeńskie, Więcbork, Tuchola, Kamień Krajeński. Prisoners were mostly deported to other concentration camps or murdered in Radzim and Rudzki Most.

References

Radzim